Touch & Go is a 2003 Canadian comedy film directed by Scott Simpson and starring Elliot Page.

Reception
The film was reviewed by Variety who said it had "a light helming touch, a breakout lead performance … neatly shot with a quirky, original style." It was reviewed in The Chronicle Herald by Andrea Nemetz and The Daily News (Halifax) by Skana Gee.

References

External links
Touch & Go at the Internet Movie Database

2003 films
2003 comedy films
Canadian comedy films
English-language Canadian films
2000s English-language films
2000s Canadian films